Daniel Delany (born 1978) is a New Zealand international lawn bowler.

Bowls career
Delany won the gold medal in the pairs with Richard Girvan and the silver medal in the fours at the 2011 Asia Pacific Bowls Championships in Adelaide.

He was selected to represent New Zealand at the 2010 Commonwealth Games, where he competed in the pairs events.

References

1978 births
New Zealand male bowls players
Living people
Bowls players at the 2010 Commonwealth Games
Commonwealth Games competitors for New Zealand